Ptychocharax rhyacophila is a species of characin endemic to Venezuela, where it is found in the upper Siapa River. This species is the only member of its genus.

References

Characidae
Monotypic fish genera
Fish of South America
Fish described in 1994